Jojo (also known as Jojo Food Truck and Jojo PDX) is a restaurant in Portland, Oregon.

Description
Jojo operates from a food cart in southeast Portland's Creston-Kenilworth neighborhood. The business specializes in fried chicken sandwiches.

History
Justin Hintze, a former real estate agent, opened Jojo in Sellwood in October 2018. The food cart relocated to a pod on Southwest Powell in 2019. Jojo became known for its social media posts in 2019. In late 2019, Jojo and Vietnamese cart Matta collaborated to launch Chơi Luôn, a restaurant within the cocktail bar Lulu.

In 2020, during the COVID-19 pandemic, Jojo offered free meals to children, restaurant workers, and hospital workers. In April, when Jojo reopened after a temporary closure, the business offered free sandwiches to all who asked. In 2021, Hintze confirmed plans to open a sibling brick and mortar restaurant in northwest Portland's Pearl District. The restaurant is expected to open on September 15, 2022.

Reception

In 2019, Jojo was a Food Cart of the Year finalist in Eater Portland Eater Awards. The website's Brooke Jackson-Glidden wrote, "Jojo stands out as a Portland icon for its social media alone, but luckily this Creston-Kenilworth cart’s hulking fried chicken sandwiches are similarly obsession-inducing. Owner Justin Hintze doesn’t hold back with spice, sauce, or smoke, topping chicken with potato salad and sambal mayo on a crisped bun, with a side of crispy-crackly jojos for gut-busting good measure."

In 2020, Nick Woo and Alex Frane included Jojo in the website's lists of "14 Outstanding Fried Chicken Sandwiches in Portland" and "14 Excellent Sandwich Shops to Try in Portland", respectively. Jojo was included in several additional Eater Portland lists in 2021, including Woo and Nick Townsend's "14 Real-Deal Fried Chicken Spots in Portland", Krista Garcia's "10 Chicken-and-Jojo Champs in Portland", Woo and Jackson-Glidden's "15 Outstanding Portland Food Carts", Daniel Barnett and Garcia's "17 Mind-Blowing Burgers in Portland and Beyond", and Jackson-Glidden's "The 38 Essential Restaurants and Food Carts in Portland". Portland Monthly included Jojo in a 2021 overview of "The Best Fried Chicken in Portland".

See also
 List of food trucks

References

External links

 

2018 establishments in Oregon
Creston-Kenilworth, Portland, Oregon
Food carts in Portland, Oregon
Food trucks
Restaurants established in 2018